Vidarabine phosphate is an adenosine monophosphate nucleotide in which ribose is replaces by an arabinso moiety. It has antiviral and possibly antineoplastic properties.

See also
 Vidarabine

References

Nucleotides